The Institute for Zionist Strategies (IZS) is an Israeli policy and research think tank that is ideologically Zionist. The IZS was established in 2005 by Israel Harel and Attorney Joel Golovensky. It is based in Jerusalem. IZS's chairman is Yoaz Hendel.

The self-described goal of the IZS is "to preserve Israel as a viable, democratic Jewish state, now and forever." For this purpose, the IZS seeks "to put forward creative policies and programs" for implementation by Israeli politicians and the general public.

Activities

The long-term goal of the IZS is the installation of a constitution for the State of Israel. To that end, the IZS, as its first major project, drafted a constitution. It was written by a team of experts and submitted to the Constitution, Law and Justice Committee of the 16th and the 17th Knesset.

The IZS has organized other task forces to deal with contemporary issues in Israel:

Constitutional Task Force
A team of experts headed by Prof. Avraham Diskin that formulated the IZS draft constitution.
In preparation for the opening of the 17th Knesset, this task force gathered a number of academics, politicians, judges, rabbis and other public figures at the IZS and drafted a proposed constitution for the State of Israel. The detailed proposal includes the various components necessary to the constitution. The draft constitution emphasizes the sections defining the State of Israel as the national home of the Jewish people, and it significantly alters the relationship between the judicial authority and the legislative and executive authorities. The Constitutional Task Force lists among its members: Prof. Avraham Diskin, Prof. Moshe Koppel, Prof. Berachyahu Lifshitz, Judge (ret.) Uri Strosemn, Rabbi Dan Barry, Dr. Yitzhak Klein, Adv. Joel Golovensky and Israel Harel. In July 2006 the IZS submitted to the president and the Knesset its constitution, entitled "A Constitution for the State of Israel." The Constitution Committee attended the hearings conducted by the 17th Knesset's Constitution, Law and Justice Committee, headed by MK Menahem Ben-Sasson.

Land Task Force
This team of experts is led by Nobel Prize laureate Prof. Israel Aumann and former secretary of the United Kibbutz Movement, Dubi Hellman. This team deals with the formulation of plans for maintaining state lands. The focus is mainly on lands in the Galilee and Negev. Among the other members of this team are Prof. Gideon Biger, Prof. Haim Gvirtzman, Prof. Yossi Katz and Gilad Altman, founder of the Green Patrol.

'Trojan Horse'
This project studied more than 20 NGOs in Israel and their donors. The Institute, in collaboration with NGO Monitor, issued a joint report, "Trojan Horse - The Impact of European Government Funding for Israeli NGOs", stating that foreign governments were funding NGOs in Israel in order to influence Israeli policy and public debate. As a result, a bill was proposed to the Knesset requiring funding disclosure by NGOs receiving support from foreign political entities. The bill was approved in February 2011 and was not well received by the European Union.

Demographic Research
A number of experts on demographics, such as Dr. Yitzhak Ravid, Yaakov Feitelson and Dr. Mike Wise, periodically publish studies on this subject. In 2008 the IZS published a comprehensive study by Yaakov Feitelson on demographic trends in Israel (1800–2007). In July 2011 the Institute published a study of demographic trends and their impact on the educational system in Israel. According to findings of the study, the data suggest a process of rapid growth in the number of first graders in Hebrew education in the coming years, the stabilization and even decline in the number of first graders in Arab schools, and a fall in the number of ultra-Orthodox students from the religious Jewish schools.

Young Leadership Program
This program aims to find and nurture young people who will become future leaders of Israel. The IZS endeavors to imbue these young people with the spirit of the values of Zionism. To do this, each year a group of about 25 young people are chosen, mostly graduate students, to serve as a discussion group that deals with issues addressed by the IZS. Under the program, members are invited to lectures and study content and articles from experts. The program requires members to deal with issues of national importance and to eventually publish their findings in position papers to be submitted to public officials.

The Young Leadership Program has submitted the following position papers:
Position Paper on health disparities between center and periphery in Israel
Position Paper on support for national task nuclei Position Paper on empowerment of the youth movements in Israel
Position Paper on the challenges of technological and vocational education in Israel
Position Paper on dealing with poverty in the State of Israel

The Young Leadership Program has also initiated the Re-Signing by the 17th Knesset of the Declaration of Independence: On Independence Day, to celebrate Israel's 60th anniversary, the IZS, led by the Young Leadership group of the Institute, asked all members of Knesset to show their faith in the values of Zionism, as expressed by the founders of the state Declaration of Independence by signing it, thereby affirming they would have signed it if they were present in 1948. Ninety MKs signed.

Zionist Beit Midrash
The Zionist Beit Midrash, itself a product of the Young Leadership Program, serves to educate young Israelis about the concepts of Zionism by exposing them to Zionist thinkers and their works. The classes are conducted in groups to make the material more interactive and study it in depth. Study sessions are highly diverse in content consisting of the philosophies of many Zionist leaders (including Binyamin Ze'ev Herzl, A.D. Gordon, Hayim Nahman Bialik, Ze'ev Jabotinsky, Rabbi Kook, David Ben-Gurion and others), touching the various ideological currents and referring back to different issues currently facing Israel.

Index of Zionist Legislation
At the end of the 17th Knesset, the IZS published the Index of Zionist legislation, and awarded gold, silver and bronze medals to Knesset members who distinguished themselves in the enactment of Zionist laws (as regarded by the IZS). The Gold Medal was awarded to MK Ya'akov Margi, the silver to MKs Othniel Schneller, Rabbi Michael Melchior and Moshe Kahlon, and the bronze medal to MKs Amnon Cohen, Gilad Erdan, Prof. Aryeh Eldad, Uri Ariel, Rabbi Yitzhak Levy and Avshalom Vilan.
In the 18th Knesset, medals were awarded to MKs Orit Noked, Zevulun Orlev and Shai Hermesh in the first session and MKs Zevulun Orlev and David Rotem in the second.

Academic Post-Zionism
The IZS, as part of the research of Dr. Hanan Moses, examined the extent of bias toward post-Zionist discourse in sociology departments throughout Israeli universities and whether the Zionist narrative is given equal treatment in Israeli academia. The investigation revealed that all Israeli universities except Bar-Ilan University have a clear post-Zionist bias in their sociology departments and this is particularly acute at the Ben-Gurion University of the Negev and Tel Aviv University. This study set off much criticism from far left-wing Israelis who compared it to McCarthyism

References

External links
 

Zionist organizations
Think tanks based in Israel
Organizations based in Jerusalem